Triphyllozoon is a genus of bryozoans in the family Phidoloporidae.

Species
Triphyllozoon arcuatum (MacGillivray, 1889)
Triphyllozoon benemunitum (Hastings, 1932)
Triphyllozoon bimunitum (Ortmann, 1890)
Triphyllozoon bucculentum Hayward, 2004
Triphyllozoon cornutum Silén, 1954
Triphyllozoon floribundum Hayward, 1999
Triphyllozoon formosoides Hayward, 2004
Triphyllozoon formosum (MacGillivray, 1884)
Triphyllozoon gracile Gordon & d'Hondt, 1997
Triphyllozoon hirsutum (Busk, 1884)
Triphyllozoon indivisum Harmer, 1934
Triphyllozoon inornatum Harmer, 1934
Triphyllozoon mauritzoni Silén, 1943
Triphyllozoon microstigmatum Silén, 1954
Triphyllozoon moniliferum (MacGillivray, 1860)
Triphyllozoon mucronatum (Busk, 1884)
Triphyllozoon munitum (Hincks, 1878)
Triphyllozoon patens Harmer, 1934
Triphyllozoon patulum Harmer, 1934
Triphyllozoon philippinense (Busk, 1884)
Triphyllozoon regulare Silén, 1954
Triphyllozoon rictum Hayward, 2004
Triphyllozoon separatum Harmer, 1934
Triphyllozoon sinicum Liu & Li, 1987
Triphyllozoon sinuatum (MacGillivray, 1884)
Triphyllozoon tenue (Kirkpatrick, 1888)
Triphyllozoon trifoliatum Harmer, 1934
Triphyllozoon tuberculiferum Harmer, 1934
Triphyllozoon tubulatum (Busk, 1884)

References

Bryozoan genera
Cheilostomatida